Motshweneng Simon Gopane (born 26 December 1970 in Bloemfontein) is a South African football coach and a former international goalkeeper. Throughout his career he played for Bloemfontein Celtic, Jomo Cosmos, Umtata Bush Bucks and Mamelodi Sundowns F.C. while also representing South Africa in the 1998 African Cup of Nations and 1998 FIFA World Cup. Since retiring he would move into goalkeeper coaching and returned to his local team Bloemfontein Celtic before having a brief spell as the Head coach for Roses United F.C.

International career
Gopane would be called up to the South African national team squad for the 1998 African Cup of Nations held in Burkina Faso as an uncapped player leading up to the tournament. He would go on to make his debut within the event on 16 February 1998 in a group game against Namibia, which South Africa won 4–1.

He was in the South African national team for the 1998 FIFA World Cup as an injury replacement. Andre Arendse was injured before the start of the tournament. His replacement, Paul Evans, was also injured shortly after arriving as a replacement. Gopane was then called up, and sat on the bench for the last two matches.
He holds the distinctive position of being the first-ever goalkeeper to wear the number 23 for his country in the FIFA World Cup.

References

External links
 
 

1970 births
Living people
Sportspeople from Bloemfontein
Association football goalkeepers
South African soccer players
South Africa international soccer players
1998 FIFA World Cup players
1998 African Cup of Nations players
Bloemfontein Celtic F.C. players
Jomo Cosmos F.C. players
Bush Bucks F.C. players
Mamelodi Sundowns F.C. players
Soccer players from the Free State (province)